The "Barrier Treaties" were a series of agreements signed and ratified between 1709 and 1715 that created a buffer zone between the Dutch Republic and France by allowing the Dutch to occupy a number of fortresses in the Southern Netherlands, ruled by the Spanish or the Austrians. The fortresses ultimately proved ineffective as a means of defence, and the treaties were cancelled by Austria in 1781.

Background

From 1672 to 1697, a series of wars with France demonstrated the Dutch Republic's vulnerability to invasion via the Spanish Netherlands, which led to debate on how to design fortifications effective in the flat terrain of the Netherlands and where to locate them. That resulted in the concept of forward defence or so-called Barrier Fortresses in the Spanish Netherlands to provide strategic depth. 

It was accepted that no fortified place could hold out indefinitely. The Republic was nearly overrun in 1672 by the speed that the French captured major fortresses like Maastricht, and it was saved only by flooding. The Barrier was intended to slow down an attacking army to allow the Dutch time to reinforce their defences without the expense of a large standing army. 

The 1697 Treaty of Ryswick permitted the Dutch to garrison a number of cities, including Namur and Ypres, but in February 1701, the French quickly occupied them. Re-establishing the Barrier was the primary Dutch objective during the War of the Spanish Succession and was specified in Article 5 of the Treaty of The Hague (1701), which reformed the Grand Alliance. The Barrier also had an economic element, since the 1648 Peace of Münster gave the Dutch a monopoly over the Scheldt and made its extent a matter of debate, particularly with Britain. The Scheldt estuary was a key transportation point for European import and export. Its control was a valuable commercial asset and allowed the merchants of Amsterdam to undermine the trade of the commercial rival, Antwerp, severely.

First Treaty (1709) 
The first Treaty was signed on 29 October 1709 between Great Britain and the States-General and was primarily driven by the need to keep the Dutch in the War of the Spanish Succession. In return for Dutch support of the Protestant succession and a commitment to continuing the war, Britain agreed to the Barrier, which effectively gave the Dutch permanent control of the Spanish Netherlands. It included Nieuwpoort, Ypres, Menen, Lille, Tournai, Valenciennes, Maubeuge, Charleroi, and Namur. The terms were seen as overly generous by British commercial interests since they included ports in Northern Flanders like Dendermonde and Ghent, which controlled trade along the Scheldt, rather than blocking potential invasion routes.

Second Treaty (1713) 

The 1710 British general election replaced the existing Whig government with a Tory administration that derived much of its support from the powerful City of London, a merchants' guild. There were demands for the greater protection of British commercial access and the removal of Ostend and Dendermonde from the list. A revised version was signed on 29 January 1713, which reduced the number of Barrier fortresses to 15; Britain agreed to ensure compliance from the future ruler of the Spanish Netherlands.

Third Treaty (1715)
The third and final treaty confirmed terms contained in the 1714 Treaty of Rastatt between Austria and France by establishing a permanent Austro-Dutch military force of 30,000 to 35,000 men stationed in the Austrian Netherlands. The Dutch would pay 40% of the costs and Austria the other 60% and an additional lump sum to maintain the Barrier and its garrisons, which were reduced to seven, with a mixed garrison at Dendermond. The treaty also renewed the 1648 Münster Treaty over the Scheldt but promised 'equal treatment" for Dutch and British commerce. The treaty was signed on 15 November 1715 and further detailed by two Austrian-Dutch agreements of 30 and 31 January 1716.

Aftermath

The Dutch Republic ended the war in 1713 effectively bankrupt, but the Dutch goal had been achieved. The Barrier was to provide a basis for peace in Europe by perpetuating the balance of power, and was to forge a foundation for the alliance between Austria, Great Britain and the Dutch Republic. Its central role enabled the Dutch Republic to participate in European power politics after 1713. Although judged favourably by contemporaries, it has later been argued by historians that the protection the Barrier offered proved illusory. The Austrians were reluctant to pay for fortresses they did not control, and the fortresses were conquered by France during the War of the Austrian Succession. However, Not all modern historians consider the barrier ineffective. Historians like Wijn and Van Nimwegen emphasise that it took 3 years of campaigning for the French to conquer all barrier fortresses during the War of Austrian Succession and that the purpose of the barrier was to give the Dutch enough time to mobilize and fortify their own borders. According to them, nobody in the Dutch Republic was under the illusion that the barrier would itself stop French armies.

However, the forts themselves were only part of the Dutch defence system; political and diplomatic treaties were more important, particularly since Britain could not allow a hostile power to control ports in Northern Flanders like Ostend. Britain's agreement to act as guarantor of the treaty and to provide the Dutch with military support against any aggressor ultimately proved to be far more effective than the Barrier itself. 

After Austria allied with France in 1756, the French threat to the Austrian Nethelands vanished and the Barrier became irrelevant. In 1781 the treaty was declared void by Emperor Joseph II. During the French Revolutionary Wars, French forces invaded and overran the Dutch Republic and established the Batavian Republic. The Netherlands remained directly or indirectly under French control for nearly two decades.

After Napoleon I's defeat in 1815, the Netherlands united with the former Austrian Netherlands and Prince Bishopric of Liège to become the United Kingdom of the Netherlands. A stronger and more complex Barrier was constructed along the new Netherlands/France border, supervised by the Duke of Wellington, a program that was largely complete by 1820, but the fortresses became part of Belgium after its independence in 1830.

Notes

References

Sources
 Afflerbach, Holger and Strachan, Hew (ed); How Fighting Ends: A History of Surrender. (OUP, 2012)
 Kubben, Raymond; Regeneration and Hegemony; Franco-Batavian Relations in the Revolutionary Era 1795-1803. (Martinus Nijhoff, 2011);
 Low,John and Pulling, F.S.; The Dictionary of English History; (Cassell, 1910);
 Myers, Denys; Violation of Treaties: Bad Faith, Nonexecution and Disregard (American Journal of International Law, 1917); 
 Nolan, Cathal; Wars of the Age of Louis XIV, 1650-1715: An Encyclopedia of Global Warfare and Civilization (Greenwood, 2008);
 Veve, Thomas Dwight; The Duke of Wellington and the British Army of Occupation in France, 1815-1818. (Greenwood, 1992).

External
Full text of the 1715 Treaty (in French).

See also
List of treaties 

1709 treaties
1713 treaties
1715 treaties
Military history of the Dutch Republic
Austrian Netherlands
Barrier Treaty
Treaties of the Dutch Republic
Treaties of the Kingdom of Prussia
18th century in The Hague
1709 in France
1713 in France
1715 in France
1709 in the Dutch Republic
1713 in the Dutch Republic
1715 in the Dutch Republic
1709 in the Holy Roman Empire
1713 in the Holy Roman Empire
1715 in the Holy Roman Empire
1715 in the Habsburg monarchy